The Cohn-Goldwater Building is an historic building in Los Angeles, California, United States. Located at 12th and San Julian Streets (525 East 12th Street), it is "the first modern steel-reinforced concrete factory building in Los Angeles". The Cohn-Goldwater Building has been designated a Los Angeles Historic-Cultural Monument.

See also 
 List of Los Angeles Historic-Cultural Monuments in Downtown Los Angeles

References

Buildings and structures in Los Angeles
Los Angeles Historic-Cultural Monuments